Abenaki (Eastern: ,) is an endangered Eastern Algonquian language of Quebec and the northern states of New England. The language has Eastern and Western forms which differ in vocabulary and phonology and are sometimes considered distinct languages.

Western Abenaki was spoken in New Hampshire, Vermont, north-western Massachusetts, and southern Quebec. Odanak, Quebec is a First Nations reserve located near the Saint-François River — these peoples were referred to as Saint Francis Indians by English writers after the 1700s. The few remaining speakers of Western Abenaki live predominately in Odanak and the last fully fluent speaker, Cécile (Wawanolett) Joubert died in 2006. A revitalization effort was started in Odanak in 1994; however, as of 2004 younger generations are not learning the language and the remaining speakers are elderly, making Western Abenaki nearly extinct.

Eastern Abenaki languages are spoken by several peoples, including the Miꞌkmaq, Maliseet, Passamaquoddy, and Penobscot of coastal Maine. The last known natively fluent speaker of Penobscot, Madeline Shay, died in 1993. However, several Penobscot elders still speak Penobscot, and there is an ongoing effort to preserve it and teach it in the local schools; much of the language was preserved by Frank Siebert.   Other dialects of Eastern Abenaki such as Caniba and Aroosagunticook are documented in French-language materials from the colonial period.

History
In Reflections in Bullough's Pond, historian Diana Muir argues that Abenaki neighbors, the pre-contact Iroquois, were an imperialist, expansionist culture whose cultivation of the corn/beans/squash agricultural complex enabled them to support a large population. They made war primarily against neighboring Algonquian peoples, including the Abenaki. Muir uses archaeological data to argue that the Iroquois expansion onto Algonquian lands was checked by the Algonquian adoption of agriculture, which enabled them to support populations large enough to raise sufficient warriors to defend against the threat of Iroquois conquest.

In 1614, six years before the Mayflower arrived in New England, Captain Thomas Hunt captured 24 young Abenaki people from what would later become Massachusetts and took them to Spain to sell as slaves. As a result, when the Mayflower landed and English settlers began to establish colonies in the southern end of Abenaki territory, relations between the settlers and natives remained guarded. The religious leaders of the Massachusetts Bay Colony discouraged social interaction with the natives.

By contrast, the French had already planted the colonies of New France in the northern part of Abenaki territory, and maintained reasonably cordial relations with the natives. Intermarriage between the French and natives gave rise to the Métis people. Over the next hundred years, conflicts between the French and the English often included their colonies and their respective native allies. The French treated their Abenaki allies with some respect; in 1706, Louis XIV knighted Chief Assacumbuit for his service, thus elevating him as a member of the French nobility.

Around 1669, the Abenaki started to emigrate to Quebec due to conflicts with English colonists and epidemics of new infectious diseases. The governor of New France allocated two seigneuries (large self-administered areas similar to feudal fiefs). The first was on the Saint Francis River and is now known as the Odanak Indian Reservation; the second was founded near Bécancour and is called the Wolinak Indian Reservation.

Abenaki wars

When the Wampanoag under Metacomet, also called "King Philip", fought the English colonists in New England in 1675 in King Philip's War, the Abenaki joined the Wampanoag. For three years there was fighting along the Maine frontier in the First Abenaki War. The Abenaki pushed back the line of white settlement by devastating raids on scattered farmhouses and small villages. The war was settled by a peace treaty in 1678.

During Queen Anne's War in 1702, the Abenaki were allied with the French; they raided numerous small villages in Maine from Wells to Casco, killing about 300 settlers over ten years. The raids stopped when the war ended. Some captives were adopted into the Mohawk and Abenaki tribes; older captives were generally ransomed, and the colonies carried on a brisk trade.

The Third Abenaki War (1722–1725), called Dummer's War, erupted when the French Jesuit missionary Sébastien Rale (or Rasles, 1657?–1724) encouraged the Abenaki to halt the spread of Yankee settlements. When the Massachusetts militia tried to seize Rasles, the Abenaki raided the settlements at Brunswick, Arrowsick, and Merry-Meeting Bay. The Massachusetts government then declared war, and bloody battles were fought at Norridgewock (1724), where Rasles was killed, and at a daylong battle at Pequawket, an Indian village near present-day Fryeburg, Maine, on the upper Saco River (1725).

Peace conferences at Boston and Casco Bay brought an end to the war. After Rale died, the Abenaki moved to a settlement on the St. Francis River.

The Abenaki from St. Francois continued to raid British colonial settlements in their former homelands along the New England frontier during Father Le Loutre's War (see Northeast Coast Campaign (1750)) and the French and Indian War.

Canada
The development of tourism projects has allowed the Canadian Abenaki to develop a modern economy while preserving their culture and traditions. For example, since 1960, the Odanak Historical Society has managed the first and one of the largest aboriginal museums in Quebec, a few miles from the Quebec-Montreal axis. Over 5,000 people visit the Abenaki Museum annually. Several Abenaki companies include: in Wôlinak, General Fiberglass Engineering employs a dozen natives, with annual sales of more than $3 million Canadian dollars. Odanak is now active in transportation and distribution. Notable Abenaki from this area include the documentary filmmaker Alanis Obomsawin (National Film Board of Canada).

United States federal tribal recognition

The Penobscot Indian Nation and the Passamaquoddy Tribe
These two tribes are officially listed federally recognized as tribes in the United States. The Passamaquoddy Tribe of Maine was recognized by the federal courts as a tribe, but not having a land trust with the government since never entering into a formal treaty. This launched the very long legal battle that paved the way for many other tribes across America to file suits regarding asset mismanagement. After winning the landmark case, similar cases were filed in 2006 by 60 tribes from throughout the United States. Among the Passamaquoddy's assets was $13.5 million in federal funds that were allocated to the tribe in 1980 through the Maine Indian Claims Settlement Act, which was settled for $81.5 million.

Vermont
Many Abenaki living in Vermont have been assimilated, and only small remnants remained on reservations during and after the French and Indian War. Facing annihilation, many Abenaki had begun emigrating to Canada, then under French control, around 1669. The Abenaki who chose to remain in the United States did not fare as well as their Canadian counterparts.

The Sokoki-St. Francis Band of the Abenaki Nation organized a tribal council in 1976 at Swanton, Vermont. Vermont granted recognition of the council the same year, but later withdrew it. In 1982, the band applied for federal recognition, which is still pending. Four Abenaki communities are located in Vermont. In 2006, the state of Vermont officially recognized the Abenaki as a people, but not a tribe. The Vermont Elnu (Jamaica) and Nulhegan (Brownington) bands' applications for official recognition were recommended and referred to the Vermont General Assembly by the Vermont Commission on Native American Affairs on January 19, 2011, as a result of a process established by the Vermont legislature in 2010.  Recognition allows applicants to seek scholarship funds reserved for American Indians and to receive federal "native made" designation for the bands' arts and crafts. On May 7, 2012, the Abenaki Nation at Missisquoi and the Koasek of the Koas Abenaki Traditional Band received recognition by the State of Vermont.

New Hampshire and minority recognition
In New Hampshire the Abenaki, along with other Native American groups, have proposed legislation for recognition as a minority group. This bill was debated in 2010 in the state legislature. The bill would have created a state commission on Native American relations, which would act as an advisory group to the governor and the state government in general. The Abenaki want to gain formal state recognition as a people.

Opponents of the bill feared it could lead to Abenaki land claims for property now owned and occupied by European Americans. Others worried that the Abenaki may use recognition as a step toward opening a casino. But the bill specifically says that "this act shall not be interpreted to provide any Native American or Abenaki person with any other special rights or privileges that the state does not confer on or grant to other state residents." New Hampshire has considered expanding gambling separate from the Native Americans.

The council would be under the Department of Cultural Resources, so it would be in the same department as the State Council on the Arts. The bill would allow for the creation and sale of goods to be labeled as native-made to create a source of income for the natives in New Hampshire.

The numerous groups of natives in the state have created a New Hampshire Inter-tribal Council, which holds statewide meetings and powwows. Dedicated to preserving the culture of the natives in New Hampshire, the group is one of the chief supporters of the HB 1610; the Abenaki, the main tribe in the state, are the only people named specifically in the bill.

Language revitalization efforts 
A new generation is actively preserving and revitalizing the language. The late Joseph Elie Joubert from the Odanak reservation and fluent speaker, Jesse Bowman Bruchac, lead partial immersion classes in the language across the Northeastern United States. They have created several Abenaki books, audio, video, and web-based media to help others learn the language. In July 2013, the Penobscot Nation, the University of Maine and the American Philosophical Society received a grant from the National Endowment for the Humanities to expand and publish the first Penobscot Dictionary.

As with most Indigenous languages, due to residential schooling and colonialism, and with the fading of generations, the number of speakers has declined. Abenaki had as few as twelve native speakers in 2015, but with recent focus and extra efforts in the Abenaki community, this number seems to be growing. Today, there are some passionate Abenaki and non-Abenaki people like Jeanne Brink of Vermont who are trying to revitalize Abenaki culture, including their language and basket-making traditions. Currently, there are about 12,000 people of varying Abenaki heritage in the Canadian and New England regions. In Maine,  there are about 3,000 Penobscot Native Americans, and this group is a large driving force of the language resurrection.

In addition to Brink and others, Jesse Bruchac is a loud voice in the Abenaki culture.  Along with writing and publishing various Abenaki books, he created a movie and sound piece telling the Native American side of Thanksgiving, spoken in Abenaki. In this film, Saints & Strangers, the three actors not only memorized their lines in Abenaki but also learned the syntax behind the language. This revitalization of the famous Thanksgiving story from a new tongue and perspective offered a more original and full version of what Thanksgiving might have really been like so many years ago.

In his novel, Lȣdwawȣgan Wji Abaznodakawȣgan: The Language of Basket Making, Bruchac notes that Abenaki is a polysynthetic language, which allows for virtually unlimited means to express oneself. Abenaki consists of both dependent and independent grammar which addresses the gender of the speaker.  Abenaki has nouns, pronouns, verbs, and adjectives. The structure of the sentence or phrase varies depending on whether the noun is animate or inanimate.

Although written primarily in English, Alnȣbak News helped to preserve the Abenaki language through the inclusion of Abenaki words and their translations. Alnȣbak News was a quarterly newsletter that discussed cultural, historical, and contemporary information regarding the Cowasuck Band of the Pennacook Abenaki. It was started in 1993 by Paul Pouilot, Sagamo of the Cowasuck Band of the Pennacook Abenaki. The word Alnȣbak/Alnôbak is often used as a synonym to Abenaki. Initially the newsletter was called Alnȣbaȣdwa National News (Alnȣbaȣdwa or Alnôbaôdwa means 'Speaking Abenaki'). Issues of the quarterly newsletter from 2003–2010 were published by the Cowasuck Band of the Pennacook Abenaki on their website. According to a statement made by the Band, after 2010, they stopped publishing the newsletter on their website due to a lack of financial support from online readers. Alnȣbak News included community-related information such as updates on governance issues, notices of social events, and obituaries. The newsletter also included Band history, genealogy, language lessons, recipes, plant and animal studies, books reviews, and writings by Band members.

The English word skunk, attested in New England in the 1630s, is probably borrowed from the Abenaki segôkw. About 500 Penobscot words are still being used in the community in everyday language such as Muhmum for 'grandpa' and nolke for 'deer'.

The 2015 National Geographic Channel miniseries Saints & Strangers told the story of the founding of Plymouth Plantation and the celebration of the "First Thanksgiving". It contained a considerable amount of dialogue in Western Abenaki. Several actors, including Tatanka Means (Hobbamock), and Raoul Trujillo (Massasoit) spoke the language exclusively throughout the series, and Kalani Qweypo (Squanto) spoke both Abenaki and English. Western Abenaki language teacher Jesse Bruchac of Ndakinna Education Center was hired as a language consultant on the film.

Dialects

Eastern Abenaki dialects include Penobscot, Norridgewock, Caniba, Androscoggin, and Pequawket.

Western Abenaki dialects are Arsigantegok, Missisquoi, Sokoki, Pennacook, and Odanak.

Phonology

Vowels 

 The phonetic value of the vowel i varies between the high front tense vowel [i] and the mid front lax vowel [e].

 [ɔ̃] is a rounded nasalized vowel and is sometimes written as ⟨ô⟩ or simply as “8”.

 Historically, it was common for speakers to drop h between vowels and to drop w before the nasal vowel [ɔ̃].

Consonants
Both the Eastern and Western dialects of Abenaki have 18 consonant sounds in total.

 In Western Abenaki there is a distinction between fortis consonants (always voiceless and aspirated) represented as [p, t, k, s, c], and lenis consonants (voiced between resonants, voiceless in word-initial and word-final positions and before a fortis consonant, unaspirated but become aspirated when they close a strongly accented syllable, which includes all final syllables) represented as [b, d, g, z, j]. The lenis consonants generally exist between vowels and at the end of words but rarely next to each other or at the beginning of words.

 It’s also important to note that w is pronounced as o when it appears at the beginning or end of a word, before a consonant, or between two consonants, and is sometimes written as o in these situations –– the o is sort of “disguised” as a w, yet still considered a consonant in these cases.

 Historically, Western Abenaki speakers vary in the ways they pronounced the alveolar affricate phonemes c and j. More than half of the population pronounced c like ts and j like dz and the rest pronounced c like the ch and the j and dg.

Stress 
Stress within words in Western Abenaki is based on an alternating stress rule:

 Stress is initially assigned to the final syllable and then to every other syllable from right to left. Yet this assignment skips the vowel /ə/ and falls to the next syllable, even if the nucleus of that syllable is also /ə/. In fact, the presence of the unstressed /ə/ results instead in a lengthening of the preceding consonant and the vowel is often deleted in writing and rapid speech. 
 Personal prefixes ne-, ke-, we- are not stressed, thus in words containing these prefixes, the stress shift with not occur on the syllable to the right. 

As of 2004, linguists are unsure if a minimum syllable count is present in order for a word to be stressed. 

Stress within sentences:

 In a declarative sentence, the pitch goes from high-low. 
 Questions have a low-high pitch at the end of the sentence, yet the entire sentence is generally said with a higher pitch. 
 Stressed syllables that exist in the middle of a sentence tend to be pronounced at a standard pitch level. 

When a word is pronounced on its own, its stressed final syllable is typically high pitched. However, this is not necessarily characteristic of the specific word, because as stated above, declarative sentences end on a low pitch.

Morphology 
The words of Western Abenaki are generally made up of a central core (the root) with affixes attached. Often a single word will translate to a phrase in English. The affixes themselves typically don’t translate to just one word either. Western Abenaki utilizes both suffixes and prefixes, often in combination (prefix-…-suffix; …-suffix -suffix; etc). The affixes tend to be quite short compared to the root of the word. With these observations in mind, Western Abenaki can be considered a synthetic agglutinative language.

Morphological processes 
There are seven morphological processes in Western Abenaki. These processes are used to describe the changes to affixes that occur when they are combined in different ways. 

 Vowel truncation –– the initial vowel of a suffix is deleted when it follows a vowel. The only exception is -wi followed by peripheral formatives, here the initial vowel of the suffix is not deleted.   

 Final glide delegation –– suffix-final glide w is deleted after a vowel when the suffix is word-final.  

 Vocalization –– glide w changes to a vowel o when the glide becomes the nucleus of a syllable due to affixation. 

 Coalescence of aw+e –– the combination of aw+e results in a single vowel o or 8.

 Coalescence of aw+a –– the preterit -ob is created from the combination of aw+ab(ani).

 Coalescence of a+a –– long /a:/ becomes nasalized ɔ̃ in some instances such as -ba+ab(ani). 

 Coalescence of wV –– w coalescence that explains why the plural peripheral formative -ak occasionally becomes -ok.

Morphosyntax 
Linguists studying Abenaki have called it a language of verbs because of its high degree of inflectional complexity. Although the language has no gender, nouns are divided into two classes: animate and inanimate (or noble and ignoble), but recent pushes seek to classify them as na/ni words in accordance with their Abenaki function. Although there may be occasional exceptions, animate words pertain to living things, and inanimate words refer to inanimate objects.

Numerals
pazekw = one
nis = two
nas = three
iaw = four
nôlan = five
ngwedôz = six
tôbawôz = seven
nsôzek = eight
noliwi = nine
mdala = ten

Other words
sanôba = man
phanem * = woman
kwai = hello (casual)
pahakwinôgwezian = hello; lit. you appear new to me (after long separations)

* letters in square brackets often lost in vowel syncope.

See also
Abenaki people

Notes

References 
 Beach, Jesse (2004). The Morphology of Modern Western Abenaki. Dartmouth College, honors thesis
 Day, Gordon M. 1994a. Western Abenaki Dictionary. Volume 1: Abenaki to English. Hull: Canadian Museum of Civilization, Mercury Series, Canadian Ethnology Service Paper 128.
 Day, Gordon M. 1994b. Western Abenaki Dictionary. Volume 2: English to Abenaki. Hull: Canadian Museum of Civilization, Mercury Series, Canadian Ethnology Service Paper 128.
 Emmon, Bach (2014). Wôbanakiôdwawôgan: Sketch of Western Abenaki Grammar. UMass Amherst 
 
 Heald, B. (2014). A History of the New Hampshire Abenaki. Charleston, South Carolina: The History Press.
 Laurent, Joseph. 1884. New Familiar Abenakis and English Dialogues. Quebec: Joseph Laurent. Reprinted 2006: Vancouver: Global Language Press, 
 LeSourd, S. Philip (2015). Enclitic Particles in Western Abenaki: Form and Function. University of Chicago  
 Masta, Henry Lorne. 1932. Abenaki Legends, Grammar and Place Names. Victoriaville, PQ: La Voix Des Bois-Franes. Reprinted 2008: Toronto: Global Language Press, 
 Voorhis, Paul. 1979. Grammatical Notes on the Penobscot Language from Frank Speck's Penobscot Transformer Tales.
 Warne, Janet. 1975. A historical phonology of Abenaki.

External links

Western Abenaki Online Dictionary and Radio

Abenaki orthography and phonology
Abenaki-Penobscot at Native-languages.org
Penobscot at Native-languages.org
Western Abenaki grammar sketch
Western Abenaki morphology
Vermont Commission on Native American Affairs

Abenaki culture
Eastern Algonquian languages
Indigenous languages of the North American eastern woodlands
First Nations languages in Canada
Extinct languages of North America
Native American language revitalization
Endangered indigenous languages of the Americas